The Syracuse Orange women represented Syracuse University in CHA women's ice hockey during the 2018-19 NCAA Division I women's ice hockey season. The Orange earned the first trip to the NCAA Tournament in program history.

Offseason

Captain Allie Munroe participated on Hockey Canada's National Women's Development Team Selection Camp and the Hockey Canada's National Women's Team Fall Festival.

Recruiting

Standings

Roster

2018–19 Orange

2018-19 Schedule

|-
!colspan=12 style="background:#0a2351; "| Regular Season

|-
!colspan=12 style="background:#0a2351; "| CHA Tournament

|-
!colspan=12 style="background:#0a2351; "| NCAA Tournament

Awards and honors

References

Syracuse
Syracuse Orange women's ice hockey seasons
Syracuse ice hockey
Syracuse ice hockey